Plum Island may refer to:

Places
Plum Island (Massachusetts), an island in Essex County, Massachusetts
Plum Island Airport,  in Newburyport, Massachusetts
Plum Island (New York), an island near Long Island, New York
Plum Island Animal Disease Center, a United States federal research facility dedicated to the study of animal diseases that is located on Plum Island, New York
Plum Island Light also known as Plum Gut Light, a lighthouse located on Plum Island, New York
Plum Island (Wisconsin), an island in Washington Township, Door County, Wisconsin
Plum Island Range Lights, a pair of range lights located on Plum Island in Door County, Wisconsin
Plum Island Bald Eagle Refuge, a 52-acre island in the Illinois River
Plum Island Site, Native American archaeological site in Illinois

Art, entertainment, and media
Plum Island (novel), a 1997 novel by Long Island author Nelson DeMille
Plum Island (Survival of the Dead), fictional island
"Plum Island," a song by the band Waterparks from the album Double Dare

See also
Plummers Island, in Montgomery County, Maryland